Beyond Tomorrow (aka Beyond This World) was an American radio drama series developed for CBS in the spring of 1950.

Beyond Tomorrow was meant to be CBS's first science fiction radio program. The show was announced in newspapers but it is not known if any episodes were actually broadcast. An audition show and three additional shows were transcribed to disk.

List of episodes

External links
OTR.net
This site has Realmedia versions of 'Incident at SwitchPath' and 'The Outer Limit'. The other episodes listed there are from Exploring Tomorrow.
Old Time Radio Researchers Group Library
Old Time Radio Researchers Group Library has streaming files of episodes 1, 2, and 3.
RadioGold Index
Full cast list and other information. Also has info on Beyond This World.
Excerpt from On The Air
Small blurb about the show.
Radio Horror Hosts
Some book quotes. Two episodes in RealMedia format
OTR Source
Good write-up. Many references
OTR Site
Text version of episode list

American radio dramas
American science fiction radio programs
1950s American radio programs
CBS Radio programs